István Bezegh-Huszágh (8 June 1913 – 7 September 1998) was a Hungarian fencer. He competed in the team épée event at the 1936 Summer Olympics.

References

External links
 

1913 births
1998 deaths
Hungarian male épée fencers
Olympic fencers of Hungary
Fencers at the 1936 Summer Olympics
People from Sopron
Sportspeople from Győr-Moson-Sopron County
20th-century Hungarian people